BuyMyTronics.com was an electronics resale business in Denver, Colorado, founded in 2007 as BuyMyBrokeniPod.com. Its business model was to purchase used and broken cell phones, iPods, iPhones, game consoles, pdas, MP3 players, Apple laptops, and other electronics that have been replaced by newer models.

BuyMyTronics.com was operated by Brett Mosley. In his first year, he hired two employees, fixed 1,000 iPods, and branched out into fixing his first dozen iPhones and game consoles. Fixed models were resold online, and other models were scrapped for their parts; Mosley stated that this was both profitable and productive toward electronic waste mitigation. His company repaired, resold, or stripped hundreds items of electronic waste per week, including cell phones, iPods, iPhones, game consoles, PDAs, Apple laptops, and MP3 players, and offered free shipping.

In 2013, BuyMyTronics was purchased and became part of the GameStop Network.

See also
 Electronic waste in the United States
 Mobile phone recycling

References

External links
 BuyMyTronics.com

2007 establishments in Colorado
2013 disestablishments in Colorado
2013 mergers and acquisitions
American companies established in 2007
American companies disestablished in 2013
Companies based in Denver
Computer companies established in 2007
Computer companies disestablished in 2013
Defunct computer companies of the United States
Electronics companies established in 2007
Electronics companies disestablished in 2013
Electronic waste in the United States
GameStop
Mobile phone recycling
Waste management companies of the United States